Miss Nobody is a 1917 American silent drama film directed by William Parke and starring Gladys Hulette.

A print is preserved in the Cinémathèque Française.

Cast
Gladys Hulette as Roma
Cesare Gravina as "Daddy" Crespi
A. J. Andrews as "Uncle" Malone
William Parke, Jr. as Jack Thurston
Sidney Mather as Roland Fabor (*Sydney Mather)

References

External links

1917 films
American silent feature films
Films directed by William Parke
American black-and-white films
Silent American drama films
1917 drama films
Pathé Exchange films
1910s American films